The Embassy of Sweden in Moscow is the chief diplomatic mission of Sweden in the Russian Federation. It is located at 60 Mosfilmovskaya Street, on the corner of Ulofa Palme Street, in the Ramenki District of Moscow.

Buildings

Chancery
In the 1910s, the embassy chancery was located at Anglijskaja Nabereschnaja 64 in Petrograd. In the early 1920s, it moved to Ulitza Vorovskij/Vorovskovo 44 in Moscow. In 1964, the embassy moved to Ulitsa Pisemskovo 15. After many years of negotiations, the construction of a new Swedish embassy in Moscow could begin in July 1968. In 1972, it was ready for use on 60 Mosfilmovskaya Street. The embassy was designed by the Swedish architect Anders Tengbom.

The embassy is a tight red brick building with a closed facade facing the street. The windows in the buildings are mainly located towards the garden. The architecture is reminiscent of the fact that the embassy was built during a time when security issues were central. But the closed, fortress-like façade would be compensated by the fact that it was possible to enter the embassy's courtyard and indoors with the help of bright interiors. After a serious incident in the 1980s, the embassy area had to be fenced off. In the courtyard, the sculpture "Gestalt i storm" by Bror Marklund dominates. The bricks for the facades were obtained from Forsa brickworks in Bollebygd.

In the summer of 2002, a new visa chancery was inaugurated at the property, which was built to cope with the extended visa processing that followed the Schengen Agreement. The extension had the same exterior appearance as previous buildings. On the ground floor are the Foreign Ministry's archives and on the ground floor a modern office environment. A large lantern provides the visa office with extra daylight. The architect was Jesper Husman at Tengbom Arkitekter.

Heads of Mission

See also 
 Russia–Sweden relations
 Diplomatic missions in Russia

References 

Russia–Sweden relations
Soviet Union–Sweden relations
Sweden
Moscow